Al-Khandaq al-Gharbi ( al-khandaq al-gharbī) is a Syrian village located in the Suqaylabiyah Subdistrict of the al-Suqaylabiyah District in Hama Governorate. According to the Syria Central Bureau of Statistics (CBS), the village had a population of 1,456 in the 2004 census.

References 

Populated places in al-Suqaylabiyah District
Populated places in al-Ghab Plain